is a subway station located at the Jimbōchō intersection of the Hakusan and Yasukuni streets in Chiyoda, Tokyo, Japan. The station is operated jointly by Tokyo Metro and Tokyo Metropolitan Bureau of Transportation (Toei).

Lines
Jimbocho Station is served by the following three subway lines.

Station layout
 Level B1: Northern ticket barriers, Toei Shinjuku Line platforms
 Level B2: Southern and western ticket barriers
 Level B3: Toei Mita Line platforms
 Level B4: Tokyo Metro Hanzomon Line platforms

Platforms

History
The Mita Line station opened on 30 June 1972 as part of the Toei Line 6. The Shinjuku Line station opened on 16 March 1980. The Hanzomon Line station opened on 26 January 1989.

The station facilities of the Hanzomon Line were inherited by Tokyo Metro after the privatization of the Teito Rapid Transit Authority (TRTA) in 2004.

Surrounding area
 Jinbōchō Theater

See also
 List of railway stations in Japan

References

External links

 Toei Jimbocho Station information 
 Tokyo Metro Jimbocho Station information

Railway stations in Japan opened in 1972
Railway stations in Tokyo
Kanda, Tokyo
Toei Mita Line
Toei Shinjuku Line
Tokyo Metro Hanzomon Line